Sin Yong-Nam (born 23 January 1978) is a North Korean former international footballer, who last played for Amrokgang Sports Club. Sin made seven appearances for the Korea DPR national football team in 2006 FIFA World Cup qualifying matches.

Goals for Senior National Team

References

External links
 Sin Yong Nam
 
 
Sin Yong-nam at DPRKFootball

1978 births
Living people
North Korean footballers
North Korea international footballers
Association football midfielders
April 25 Sports Club players
Amnokgang Sports Club players